Frederick Gale (16 July 1823 – 24 April 1904) was an English cricket writer and cricketer who played in two first-class cricket matches in 1845.

By profession Gale was a solicitor in Westminster and a Parliamentary agent, but he was also a prolific writer and journalist, often using the pen name "Old Buffer". His books included The Game of Cricket and the ghost-written memoirs of the cricketer Robert Grimston. As a journalist and columnist he contributed to Baily's Magazine of Sports and Pastimes, continuing to write until his death.

Gale was born at Woodborough in Wiltshire, the son of a Church of England clergyman who was rector of Godmersham between 1829 and 1864. He was educated at Winchester College. He played in the Winchester cricket XI and later as an amateur cricketer for a variety of teams, including teams representing Surrey, but his two matches for Kent County Cricket Club and the Gentlemen of Kent in 1845 are the only ones to have been accorded first-class status.

Living for many years at Mitcham in Surrey, Gale took a keen interest in Surrey County Cricket Club. He married Claudia Severn in 1852; the couple had a son and four daughters. Gale moved to Manitoba in Canada in 1891 but later returned to England and was a visitor at The Oval until the year before his death. He died in 1904 at the age of 80 at the London Charterhouse in the City of London.

Books
Public School Matches and Those We Meet There, 1853 & 1867
Ups and Downs of a Public School, 1859
Echoes from Old Cricket Fields, 1871
Memoir of Hon. R. Grimston, 1885
Modern English Sports, 1885
Sports and Recreations, 1885
The Game of Cricket, 1887

References

External links
 
 

1823 births
1904 deaths
English cricketers
Kent cricketers
Gentlemen of Kent cricketers
People educated at Winchester College
Cricket historians and writers
People from Godmersham